Alan Keith Nobbs (born 19 September 1961) is an English former professional footballer.

Playing career
Nobbs' 326 games in all competitions for Hartlepool United places him 10th in the all–time appearance list. He was named supporters' Player of the Year in 1991–92.

Post–playing career
After retiring Nobbs spent a short time working as a housing officer. In 1996, he began working for Hartlepool United's community programme.

His daughter is England women's football international Jordan Nobbs.

References

External links

1961 births
Living people
Sportspeople from Bishop Auckland
Footballers from County Durham
English footballers
Blackpool F.C. players
Middlesbrough F.C. players
Halifax Town A.F.C. players
Bishop Auckland F.C. players
Hartlepool United F.C. players
Gateshead F.C. players
English Football League players
Association football fullbacks
Hartlepool United F.C. non-playing staff